D'Myna Leagues is a Canadian animated television series, which aired on CTV from 2000 to 2004. Loosely based on the baseball writing of W. P. Kinsella, the series was set in a world populated by anthropomorphic birds, and centred on the minor league baseball team in the town of Mynaville. The baseball games were represented by placing two-dimensional characters in three-dimensional backgrounds. The teams of bird characters were opposed by rival teams like the Weasels, the Pigs, the Beavers and the Elephants.

The series was created by the Vancouver-based Studio B Productions.

In the United States, the series aired on The WB 100+ Station Group. there were 3 dvds release between 2003 and 2005 then in 2011 the first season was on DVD season 1 is pretty easy to find season 2 is lost by the way only one dub you can find

Characters

Mynaville Mynas
Ebbet Myna (Matt Hill): Shortstop

Nikki Tinker (Tabitha St. Germain): Second base

Rip Hickory (Jim Byrnes): Catcher and Manager

Lucinda "Lefty" Lane (Teryl Rothery): Relief Pitcher

Reggie Stainback (Phil Hayes): Third base

Flamingo Kid (Michael Dobson): Pitcher

Big Tree Powell (Scott McNeil): First base

Jackie Mungo (Scott McNeil): Outfielder

Jeff Mungo (Phil Hayes): Outfielder

Steve Mungo (Terry Klassen): Outfielder

Mud Flap Flammen (Phil Hayes)

Sammy Spinoza

Antagonists
Commissioner Ratso Radcliffe (Gerard Plunkett)

Paully (Ian James Corlett)

Schlitzy (Michael Dobson)

Commentators
Barry (David Kaye)

Bart (Ian James Corlett)

Harry (Brent Chapman)

Others
Abe the Ump (Terry Klassen):

Divinity Plunkett (Kathleen Barr): Owner of the Mynas

Rod Blackbird (Rod Black): A  documentary filmmaker who appears in the episode "A Starling Is Born".

Episodes

Season 1

Season 2

References

External links
 
 

2000 Canadian television series debuts
2004 Canadian television series endings
2000s Canadian animated television series
Canadian children's animated sports television series
Baseball television series
English-language television shows
CTV Television Network original programming
Animated television series about birds
Television series by Sony Pictures Television
Television shows filmed in Vancouver